The Pittsburgh Journal of Technology Law & Policy is a biannual law review covering legal topics involving intellectual property and technology. The journal is published by an independent student group at the University of Pittsburgh School of Law, with recent issues available open access online. The journal is published by the Hillman Library as part of the D-Scribe Digital Publishing Program in conjunction with the University of Pittsburgh Press.

References

External links
 

American law journals
Technology law journals
University of Pittsburgh student publications
Law journals edited by students
Publications established in 2000
English-language journals